was a statesman of the Yamato imperial court. His alternative names include Emishi and Toyora no Ōomi. After the death of his father Soga no Umako, Emishi took over  Ōomi , the Minister of State, from his father.

According to the Nihonshoki, from the end of the reign of Empress Suiko to that of Empress Kōgyoku, Emishi enjoyed influence in the court.  After the death of Empress Suiko, Emishi succeeded in installing Prince Tamura on the throne as Emperor Jomei by citing the will of Empress Suiko. Although Prince Yamashiro was another candidate, Emishi murdered Sakaibe no Marise, his uncle who nominated Oe no Ou, paving the way for his favorite. After the discernment of Emperor Jomei, Emishi supported Empress Kōgyoku. 

His daughter, Soga no Tetsuki no Iratsume, was a wife of Emperor Jomei and bore Emperor Jomei one daughter Princess Yata.

In 645, when his son Iruka was murdered in front of the Empress, Emishi committed suicide the next day.

References 
 

587 births
645 deaths
Japanese politicians who committed suicide
Soga clan
Suicides in Japan
People of Asuka-period Japan